Łukasz Kominiak (born 17 February 1990) is a Polish former footballer.

References

External links
 
 

Polish footballers
Living people
1990 births
Association football defenders
Kmita Zabierzów players
Sandecja Nowy Sącz players
Kolejarz Stróże players
Raków Częstochowa players
Legionovia Legionowo players
Świt Nowy Dwór Mazowiecki players
Broń Radom players
KTS Weszło Warsaw players